Blackbirds is an extant 1915 American silent film drama produced by Jesse Lasky and distributed through Paramount Pictures. The film marks an early starring screen appearance by actress Laura Hope Crews in this her second motion picture. The film is based on a 1913 Broadway play, Blackbirds, by Harry James Smith which also starred Crews. This is a surviving film at the Library of Congress.

It was remade in a 1920 film of the same name starring Justine Johnstone.

Plot

Cast
Laura Hope Crews - Leonie Sobatsky
Thomas Meighan - Jack Doggins/Honorable Nevil Trask
George Gebhardt - Bechel
Raymond Hatton - Hawke, Jr.
Jane Wolfe - Countess Maroff (* as Jane Wolf)
Florence Dagmar - Miss Crocker
Evelyn Desmond - Mrs. Crocker
Edwin Harley - Mr. Crocker (* as Ed Harley)
Frederick Wilson - Abie Isaacs

References

External links

allmovie/synopsis

1915 films
American silent feature films
Films directed by J. P. McGowan
American films based on plays
Paramount Pictures films
Silent American drama films
1915 drama films
American black-and-white films
1910s American films